Carey Burtt is a filmmaker and musician based in New York City, mainly working in the underground genre.

Films 

Known for their disturbing humor and dark narratives, the films of Carey Burtt include The Psychotic Odyssey of Richard Chase and The Death of Sex, both featured in the second edition of Jack Sargeant's book Deathtripping: The Cinema of Transgression. Psychotic Odyssey is distributed by the cult production company Troma Entertainment in its "Best of Tromadance Vol. 1" DVD. It was also featured in Other Cinema's Experiments in Terror video exhibition.

Burtt's 1999 short Mind Control Made Easy or How to Become a Cult Leader was featured in the 2005 Hell on Reels: Astoria Moving Image Festival and enjoyed audience praise. An instructional film outlining  the techniques used by destructive cults, Mind Control was also featured on Supersphere.com where it received an audience award. Fragments from Mind Control have been used by Flying Lotus' alter ego Captain Murphy on the album Duality, released in 2012. Burtt's films have been shown in several festivals including New York and Chicago Underground and The FanTasia Film Festival. In January 2009 the Boston Underground Film Festival celebrated his work with a retrospective screening event.

In 2004 he completed his first feature, A Forked World which was co-written and co-directed by Tucson Weekly film critic James DiGiovanna. It won "Most Effectively Offensive" at the Boston Underground Film Festival in 2005.  Burtt and DiGiovanna also collaborated on a parody of political ads, which was featured on a segment on MSNBC in December 2007.

In 2019 Burtt completed his second feature Corpus Chaosum which won best experimental film at the 2021 First Hermetic International Film Festival.

Music 

Carey's Problem formed in the summer of 1986 with Cindy Brolsma and Lisa Jenio, The Problem never quite reached its full potential but released the album "Arena of Shame" in 1990 and was produced by Dave Sardy. The song "Led Zeppelin" had college radio play and was featured in the Steve Zahn film Freak Talks About Sex which played on Cinemax.

Gigi Disco Rock was formed in 1998 with friends and put out two CDs: "Will You Love Me?" and "More Songs For Clucky."

In 1992 Burtt worked with film director/painter Julian Schnabel on his cd Every Silver Lining Has a Cloud released by Island Records and produced by Bill Laswell (released 1995).

Filmography
Till Death Do You Part (1974)  - Reg 8mm - 4 mins
Zombie film (1974) - Reg 8mm - 3 mins
Earthquake (1974) - Reg 8mm - 19 mins
Bionic Brothers (1974) - Reg 8mm - 5 mins
Jaws (remake) (1975)  - unfinished - footage lost - Super 8mm - short
Killer Pop Tarts (1976) - Super 8mm (March 14, 1976) - 2 mins
Hit Man (1976) - Super 8mm - 7 mins (color b&w)
Future Movie (1976) - Regular 8mm - 4 mins (unfinished)
It Thrived On Monkeys (then there were none) (1977) 06/18/77 - Super 8mm - 5 mins
Star Wars (remake) (1977) - unfinished - footage lost - Regular 8mm - short
The Star Wars Aptitude Test (1977) - Regular 8mm - 5 mins 
Vampire’s Apprentice (1977) - Super 8mm - 15 mins
Rock Band Animation (1977) - Super 8mm - 2 mins
A Clownwork Orange (1978) - Super 8mm - 3 mins (finished on video)
The Race (1978) - Super 8mm - 2 mins
Doorway to Fear (1978) - Super 8mm - 4 mins
Odysseus and the Cyclops (1978) - Super 8mm - 3 mins
Hitch Hike (1979) - Super 8mm - 6 mins
Avant Guard (1979) - Super 8mm - 3 mins
The Santa Claus Hitler Film (1979) - Super 8mm - short (Lost)
Eulogy (1980) - Super 8mm - 4 mins
Extraordinary People (1980) - Super 8mm - 8 mins
Afternoon of an Earwig (1980) - Super 8mm - 4 mins
Egg Movie (1980) Super 8mm - 4 mins
The World In One Take (1981) - Super 8mm - (B&W Color) - 8 mins
Awakening Son (1982) - Super 8mm - 19 mins
Devil War Movie (1982) - Super 8mm - 6mins (B&W)
Guitar Love (1983) - 16mm (Lost Film surviving digital copy) - 4 mins
The John Wayne Gacy Film (1983) - 16mm (Lost) short
Body and Soul (1983) - 16mm - (Lost) short
I Talk to the Trees (1983) -16mm - (Lost) short
Framing Bitches (1988) - unfinished - Super 8mm short - 7 mins 
The DH Lawrence Film (1989) co dir: James DiGiovanna - S 8mm - fin on HD vid - 4 mins
Hey Mister, You’re in the Girls’ Room (1990) - 16mm - 5 mins
City of Feelings (1990) - Finished on DV (16mm print  AKA “Festival of Feelings”) - 20 mins
The Death of Sex (1998) - 16mm - 5 mins
The Psychotic Odyssey of Richard Chase (1998) - 16mm - 7 mins
Mind Control Made Easy (or how to become a cult leader) (1999) - 16mm - 13 mins
The Dissociative Disorder Movie (2000) - Remade in 2010 - DV - aprox 20mins
Sun of God (2003) - 5 mins 16mm DV
A Forked World (2004) - DV Feature made with James DiGiovanna - 1hr 22min
Through a Gash Deathly (2006) - 16mm finished on DV - 7 mins
Spirits of Authority (2006) - DV - 5 mins
Drunk Mother Movie (2006) - DV - 3 mins
Lib Beed Away (2006) - DV - 2 mins
Kant Movies (2007) - DV - with James DiGiovanna - 3 mins
Dream of a Ridiculous Man (2009) - 16mm / DV - finished on DV - 11 mins
Dead Set (2009) - Super 8mm - Finished on DV - 5 mins
How Not To Be Stupid (a guide to critical thinking) - 16mm/DV - finished on DV - 9 mins
The Dissociative Disorder Movie (2010) - DV - 11 mins
Blood & Fire (2011) - HDV / 16mm - finished on HDV - 10 mins
Helping: with Travis (2012) - HDV - 12 mins
Pigs & Vampires (2012) - HD Video - 10 mins
Jesus Loves Me: now how do I get him to stop calling? (2012) - HD Video - 6 mins
Doors of Reflection (2017) - HD Video - 3 mins
God’s Good Work (2017) - HD Video - 4 mins
Corpus Chaosum (2019) - HD Video Feature - 1 hr 15 mins
Embracism (2020) - HD Video - 5 mins
Cosmetic Consciousness (2020) - HD Video Feature - 1hr 13 mins
Malevolent Intelligence (2020) - HD Video Feature - 1hr 30 mins
The Demonic Option (2020) - HD Video Feature - 58 mins
Gaslighting: Fact or Fiction? (2021) - HD Video - 10 mins
Heavenly Resentments (2021) - HD Video - 1hr 11 mins
Sensible Malevolence (2021) - HD Video - 1hr 19 mins
Art Film Retrospective (2021) - HD Video - 37 mins

References

External links 
 
 Carey Burtt Music-Bandcamp
 Carey Burtt Music-YouTube
 Carey Burtt Films
 Carey Burtt aka "KingHotPants" on Youtube
 Jack Sergeant: Communication and The Lonely Worlds of Carey Burtt.

American filmmakers
Musicians from New York City
Living people
Year of birth missing (living people)